The Big Sound is an album by saxophonist Gene Ammons recorded in 1958 and released on the Prestige label. The album was recorded at the same sessions which produced Groove Blues.

Reception
AllMusic reviewer Scott Yanow stated: "Ammons is easily the main star (he really excelled in this setting) and is in generally fine form".

Track listing 
 "Blue Hymn" (Gene Ammons) – 12:37    
 "The Real McCoy" (Mal Waldron) – 8:33    
 "Cheek to Cheek" (Irving Berlin) – 14:12    
 "That's All" (Alan Brandt, Bob Haymes) – 13:58

Personnel 
Gene Ammons – tenor saxophone
Jerome Richardson – flute
John Coltrane – alto saxophone (track 2)
Paul Quinichette – tenor saxophone (track 2) 
Pepper Adams – baritone saxophone (tracks 2 & 4)
Mal Waldron – piano
George Joyner – bass
Art Taylor – drums

References 

Gene Ammons albums
1958 albums
Prestige Records albums
Albums recorded at Van Gelder Studio
Albums produced by Bob Weinstock